Charles Bernard Borel  (October 14, 1883 – March 15, 1960) was an American Thoroughbred horse racing jockey best known for winning the 1917 Kentucky Derby.

Biography
He was born in Le Locle, Switzerland on October 14, 1883.

Borel rode for prominent stable owners such as Harry Payne Whitney and James Butler. For Whitney he notably won the 1913 Futurity Stakes with Pennant, and for Butler, finished second in the 1915 Kentucky Derby aboard Pebbles. He then won the 1917 Derby with Omar Khayyam, the first foreign-bred horse to win the prestigious race.

By the mid-1930s, a retired Charles Borel made his home in Los Angeles, California where he was an exercise rider at Santa Anita Park.

He died on March 15, 1960, in Los Angeles, California.

References

1960 deaths
American jockeys
Sportspeople from California
1883 births
People from Le Locle